Ardozyga aspetodes is a species of moth in the family Gelechiidae. It was described by Edward Meyrick in 1904. It is found in Australia where it has been recorded from Victoria.

The forewings are dark brown-grey with the stigmata dark fuscous, each followed by a minute pale dot, the plical obliquely beyond the first discal, the second discal transverse. There is a series of pale dots along the posterior part of the costa and termen. The hindwings are fuscous with a terminal series of pale dots.

References

Ardozyga
Moths described in 1904
Taxa named by Edward Meyrick
Moths of Australia